Michael Dable (born 20 September 1994), known professionally as Mickey Kojak, is an Australian musician, singer, songwriter and producer from Sydney, New South Wales. Mickey supported Bag Raiders on their 2019 Horizons tour. Mickey received full rotation on radio for songs "Get Out" and "All That Acid". His debut studio album Ultra is scheduled for release in 2022.

Early life
Dable was born on 20 September 1994.

Career

2021–present: Ultra
On 20 August 2021, Dable released the single "Lights Out". Alongside the single's release, he announced the title of his forthcoming debut album Ultra, revealing it would be released in 2022.

In 2022 his debut album “Ultra”, was released digitally

Musical style and influences
Dable's music has been categorised as 
dance, electronic, and indie rock.

Discography

Studio albums

Extended plays

Singles

As lead artist

As featured artist

References

21st-century Australian singers
Australian dance musicians
Living people
Musicians from Sydney
1994 births